Claudiu Gabriel Borțoneanu (born 4 October 1999) is a Romanian professional footballer who plays as a right midfielder. Borțoneanu grew up at Rapid București, but made its debut at senior level for Sportul Snagov, club for which he played in more than 90 matches at the level of Liga II.

Career Statistics

Club

References

External links
 
 
 Claudiu Borțoneanu at frf-ajf.ro

1999 births
Living people
Footballers from Bucharest
Romanian footballers
Association football midfielders
FC Rapid București players
Liga I players
FC Voluntari players
Liga II players
CS Sportul Snagov players
FC Metaloglobus București players
Liga III players
CS Corvinul Hunedoara players